The Royal Embassy of Cambodia in London is the diplomatic mission of Cambodia in the United Kingdom, located near the localities of Willesden Green and Brondesbury Park. It is unusual in being relatively far from central London -  it is the northernmost of any embassy in the city - as well as for being located in a house on a suburban street. The embassy was formerly located at 28-32 Wellington Road, in St. John's Wood - this same building also housed the Embassy of South Sudan at one time.

In 2013 British author Zadie Smith published a short story entitled The Embassy of Cambodia in The New Yorker magazine, which was later published in book format.

Gallery

References

External links
Official Web Site

Cambodia
Diplomatic missions of Cambodia
Cambodia–United Kingdom relations
Buildings and structures in the London Borough of Brent
Willesden